Eleocharis parishii is a species of spikesedge known by the common name Parish's spikerush.

It is native to Northern Mexico, the Southwestern United States (from southwestern Oregon and California east to Kansas and western Texas). It grows in moist and sandy habitats with fresh to brackish water.

Description
The narrow leaves are dark purplish to brown at the bases and becoming lighter in color toward the tips.

The inflorescence is a lance-shaped spikelet appearing at the tip of the stem and measuring up to 1.5 centimeters long. It contains many flowers covered in dark brown bracts.

References

External links
Eleocharis parishii — U.C. Photo gallery

parishii
Brackish water plants
Freshwater plants
Flora of the Southwestern United States
Flora of Northeastern Mexico
Flora of Northwestern Mexico
Natural history of the California chaparral and woodlands
Plants described in 1889